Vladimir Leonidovich Dergach (born 1 January 1957) is a Russian professional football coach and a former player. He is an assistant coach with FC Rotor-2 Volgograd.

External links
 

1957 births
Living people
Soviet footballers
Russian football managers
FC Lada-Tolyatti managers
FC Baltika Kaliningrad managers
FC Elista managers
Russian Premier League managers
FC Metallurg Lipetsk managers
FC Mordovia Saransk managers
FC Astana-1964 managers
Association football defenders
FC Yenisey Krasnoyarsk players
FC Khimik Dzerzhinsk players